This is a list of educational institutions in Shimla, India.

Schools

 Auckland House School
 Bishop Cotton School
 Central School for Tibetans
 Convent of Jesus and Mary
 Himalayan International School, Chharabra
 Loreto Convent, Tara Hall
 Shimla Public School
 S.D. Senior Secondary School
St. Edward's School

Colleges
 Government College, Sanjauli
 St. Bede's College

Universities
 Alakh Prakash Goyal University
 Himachal Pradesh University
 Himachal Pradesh National Law University

References

Schools in Shimla district
 
Shimla education
Shimla